News Profile is a Canadian news and biography television series which aired on CBC Television from 1972 to 1974.

Premise
Jan Tennant hosted this series in which each episode included a brief headline newscast followed by a feature on a particular personality.

Profiles
Some of the people presented on News Profile included:

1972–1973 season
 Salvador Allende (Chilean president)
 Idi Amin (Ugandan president)
 Willy Brandt (German chancellor)
 Alan Eagleson (Hockey
 Francisco Franco (Spanish head of state)
 Edward Heath (British prime minister)
 Ferdinand Marcos (Philippine president)
 Juan Perón (Argentine president)

1973–1974 season
 Charles Herbert Best (insulin)
 Michel Couvin (Canadian Commissioner in South Vietnam)
 Richard J. Daley (Chicago mayor)
 Duke Ellington (musician)
 William Higgitt (RCMP Commissioner)
 Robert Lemieux (October Crisis lawyer)
 Peter Lougheed (Alberta premier)
 Georges Pompidou (French president)

Scheduling
This 15-minute series was broadcast on Sundays at 12:30 p.m. (Eastern) from 17 September 1972 to 26 May 1974.

References

External links
 

CBC Television original programming
1972 Canadian television series debuts
1974 Canadian television series endings